Malini Kapoor is an Indian television and theatre actress.

Television

 Yeh Hawayein as Resham
Jai Mahabharat as Ambalika
Ramayan as Shrutakirti
Ssshhhh...Koi Hai
 Sssshhh... Phir Koi Hai as Chandrika (episode – Satawan Dulha)
Adaalat 
Zaara (TV series) as Zeenat
Kumkum - Ek Pyara Sa Bandhan  as Malini
 Y.A.R.O Ka Tashan as Beena Agarwal
CID (Indian TV series)
 Hari Mirchi Lal Mirchi as Rinku Khanna
 Gunwale Dulhania Le Jayenge as Ekta
Balika Vadhu as Pushpa
Rab Se Sohna Isshq as Beauty

 Rangrasiya as Phulwari
Maddam Sir as Garima

Personal life 

Kapoor is married to actor Ajay Sharma. The couple gave birth to their son, Kiyan in December 2017.

References

Living people
1984 births
Indian television actresses
21st-century Indian actresses